Solid is one of the four fundamental states of matter.

Solid may also refer to:

Biology
ABI Solid Sequencing, a DNA sequencing system
Signs Of LIfe Detector (SOLID), an astrobiology instrument for in situ analyses

Computing
Solid (KDE), a device framework of KDE
SOLID (object-oriented design)
Solid (web decentralization project)
solidDB, a database

Arts, entertainment, and media

Music
Solid (Ashford & Simpson album) (1984)
"Solid" (Ashford & Simpson song), its title track
Solid (Grant Green album) (1964 [1979])
Solid (Groundhogs album) (1974)
Solid (Michael Henderson album) (1976)
Solid (Mandrill album) (1975)
Solid (Woody Shaw album) (1986)
Solid (U.D.O. album) (1997)
Solid!, a 1998 album by Eric Alexander
"Solid" (Young Thug and Gunna song), 2021

Other uses in arts, entertainment, and media
Solid (billiard ball), the wholly colored balls 1-7
Solid, a very strong suit in contract bridge
Solid Snake, a character in the Metal Gear games series

Other uses
Solid (geometry), the geometry of three-dimensional Euclidean space
Solid, a slang term signalling agreement or used as a synonym for "favor" (good turn)
Solid seat, one that is unlikely to change hands, in the nomenclature of political forecasting

See also
Solid state (disambiguation)